The Diplomatic Pouch is a 1927 Soviet silent thriller film directed by Oleksandr Dovzhenko. The first two parts of the film are lost.

Plot
The film's plot is based on the real murder of the Soviet diplomatic courier Theodor Nette abroad. The pouch of the Soviet diplomat, which is stolen by British spies, is taken away by the sailors of a ship sailing to Leningrad who deliver it to the authorities. The intelligence agents make every effort to retrieve the bag.

Production
Dovzhenko was invited to stage the film because of his knowledge of the diplomatic sphere; he also used to work as a diplomatic courier. Under the influence of the German cinema school, he fills the movie with clichés borrowed from German crime fiction: a brawl in the compartment of an international express train and on its steps, a fight on the deck of the ship, a steamer pursuing the boat, and so on. Many of the genre's stock characters appear: spies, prostitutes, police agents, visitors of port pubs, and jazz bands.

At this time, cinematographer Nikolai Kozlovsky introduces Dovzhenko to cropping techniques. The film features images with a lot of unusual angles, night shooting and expressionistic effects (using optical prisms).

Dovzhenko appears on screen, for the only time in his career, as a ship's stoker. In the film there is a scene where inspector White offers money to the stoker, who throws it back into his face. A very similar thing happened in Dovzhenko's life: once a man came to him for an appointment at work, who wanted monetary help because he suffered under the Bolsheviks. He even had with him a letter of recommendation written by the Empress Maria Feodorovna. After reading, Dovzhenko "neatly folded the sheets and threw them in the face of the degenerate", then banged his fist on the table and screamed.

Reception
"The Diplomatic Pouch" was made with high production values at the level typical of 1920s adventure films. It was well received by the audience, who watched it with pleasure and the film was in the cinemas for a long time and was also shown abroad. But Dovzhenko had not yet found his signature style; he called the film "a pathetic attempt at writing."

Cast
M. Buyukli as Embassy Secretary
A. Klymenko as First Diplomatic Courier
Heorhii Zelondzhev-Shypov as nd. Diplomatic Courier
Ida Penzo as Helen Viskovska
Boris Zagorsky as Spy
Sergei Minin as Inspector White 
H. Skoretskyi as Harry
Ivan Kapralov as Ralph
V. Komaretskyi as Captain of Ship 'Victoria'
Aleksandr Dovzhenko as Stoker
Dmytro Kapka as Passenger
Konstantin Eggert as Sailor-Boxer

References
 Госейко Л., «Історія українського кінематографа. 1896 — 1995», К.: KINO-КОЛО, 2005 р.

External links
 

Soviet silent feature films
1920s thriller films
Films directed by Alexander Dovzhenko
Soviet black-and-white films
Soviet thriller films
1920s Russian-language films
Silent thriller films